Boghall is a Council Estate built in the early 1960s in West Lothian, Scotland just to the east of Bathgate.

Boghall's two primary schools are Boghall Primary School and St. Columbus R.C. Primary School. Boghall has a range of amenities including a community centre, post office, 3 corner shops, a Scotmid supermarket, pharmacy, chip shop and indian restaurant as well as a second hand shop and NHS clinic and care home. Boghall is also home to Boghall Butchers which has won many awards for its pies and other foods. There are also 5 play parks around Boghall including Kirkton park, a community park which large green areas, a band stand and bowling/tennis club. Party in the park a small local festival is held here each year in September. In the middle of the estate is the Boghall Parish Church of Scotland which offers weekly worship as well as various activities during the week in the Church hall.  Boghall is found just on Puir wives brae which is part of the Bathgate hills. Bathgate academy is also found within Boghall to the South West. Just outside of Boghall is the Pyramids business park along with a Toby Carvery restaurant, a Premier inn hotel and a petrol station all of which local people consider to be in Boghall.

Notable residents
Boghall and Bathgate Caledonia Pipe Band

External links

Canmore - Bathgate, Boghall Farmstead site record

Villages in West Lothian
Bathgate
Housing estates in Scotland